Bankstown Bruins is a NBL1 East club based in Sydney, New South Wales. The club fields a team in the Men's NBL1 East. The club is a division of Bankstown Basketball Association (BBA), the major administrative basketball organisation in the region. The Bruins play their home games at Bankstown Basketball Stadium.

Club history

Background
In 1979, a Bankstown Bruins men's team entered the National Basketball League (NBL) for the league's inaugural season. In 1983, Robbie Cadee was named the recipient of the NBL Coach of the Year Award after helping the Bruins improve from a 2–24 record in 1982 to a 12–10 record in 1983. After seven disappointing seasons as the Bruins, the team was renamed the West Sydney Westars for the 1986 NBL season. That year, the Westars finished in fifth place with a 15–12 record. Following the 1987 season, the Westars merged with the Sydney Supersonics to become the Sydney Kings.

Waratah League / NBL1 East
In 1991, a reinvigorated Bankstown Bruins club joined the Waratah League (then known as the NSW Premier Division) for the league's inaugural season, with a team entered into both the men's and women's competition. In 1993, the men won their first title, before winning two more in 1996 and 1997. The women on the other hand put together a championship three-peat between 1997 and 1999.

With the NSW premier basketball league entering the Australian Basketball Association in 2001, the league became known as the Waratah League. Success continued for the club throughout the 2000s and 2010s, with the women winning seven championships between 2003 and 2015, while the men collected their fourth title in 2016.

The Waratah League was rebranded as NBL1 East for the 2022 season. The women's team did not enter the 2022 NBL1 East season.

Season by season

References

External links
 BBA's official website

Waratah League teams
Defunct National Basketball League (Australia) teams
Basketball teams established in 1979
1979 establishments in Australia
Sports teams in Sydney
Basketball teams in New South Wales
Bankstown, New South Wales